Fado is the first album by Portuguese fado singer Carminho. It was released on 22 May 2009 and was a huge critical and commercial success. It is a more traditional fado album than its follow-up, Alma, featuring versions of several famous fado songs.

Track listing
 "Escrevi o Teu Nome no Vento (Fado Carriche)" (lyrics, Jorge Rosa, music, Raúl Ferrão)
 "A Bia da Mouraria"
 "Meu Amor Marinheiro"
 "Palavras Dadas (Fado Rosita)"
 "Espelho Quebrado"
 "Marcha de Alfama"
 "O Tejo Corre no Tejo"
 "A Voz (Fado Licas)"
 "Voltar a Ser"
 "Carta a Lisboa (Fado Alexandrino da Rocha)"
 "Carta a Leslie Burke"
 "Uma Vida Noutra Vida (Fado Pechincha)"
 "Nunca É Silêncio Vão (Fado Pedro Rodrigues)"
 "Senhora da Nazaré"

2009 albums
Carminho albums